Malachius is a genus of soft-winged flower beetles belonging to the family Melyridae subfamily Malachiinae. Malachius species have been reported from Albania, Belgium, Bulgaria, Czech Republic, France, Germany, Hungary, Italy, Poland, Spain, Sweden, Switzerland and in former Yugoslavia.

Species
 Malachius aeneus (Linnaeus, 1758)
 Malachius agenjoi Pardo, 1975
 Malachius artvinensis Wittmer, 1974
 Malachius australis Mulsant & Rey, 1867
 Malachius bilyi Svihla, 1987
 Malachius bipustulatus (Linnaeus, 1758)
 Malachius caramanicus Pic, 1912
 Malachius carnifex Erichson, 1840
 Malachius cavifrons
 Malachius coccineus Waltl, 1838
 Malachius conformis Erichson, 1840
 Malachius cressius Pic, 1904
 Malachius cyprius (Baudi, 1871)
 Malachius dama Abeille de Perrin, 1888
 Malachius demaisoni Abeille, 1900
 Malachius elaphus Abeille, 1890
 Malachius ephipiger Redtenbacher, 1843
 Malachius faldermanni Faldermann, 1836
 Malachius fuscatus Peyron, 1877
 Malachius graecus Kraatz, 1862
 Malachius heydeni Abeille de Perrin, 1882
 Malachius kasosensis Wittmer, 1988
 Malachius kraussi Reitter, 1902
 Malachius labiatus Brullé, 1832
 Malachius lusitanicus Erichson, 1840
 Malachius mariaeAbeille de Perrin, 1885
 Malachius pickai Svihla, 1987
 Malachius rubidus Erichson, 1840
 Malachius scutellaris Erichson, 1840
 Malachius securiclatus Baudi, 1873
 Malachius semiaeneus Abeille de Perrin, 1891

References 

 Biolib
 Fauna Europaea

Melyridae
Cleroidea genera
Taxa named by Johan Christian Fabricius